27 Vulpeculae is a single, blue-white star in the northern constellation of Vulpecula. It is a dim star, visible to the naked eye, with an apparent visual magnitude of 5.59. An annual parallax shift of  provides a distance estimate of about 306 light-years.

This is a B-type main-sequence star with a stellar classification of B9 V. It is spinning rapidly, showing a projected rotational velocity of 335. The star has an estimated 2.77 times the mass of the Sun and about 3.1 times the Sun's radius. It is radiating 75 times the Sun's luminosity from its photosphere at an effective temperature of 10,789 K.

References

External links
 

B-type main-sequence stars
Vulpecula
Durchmusterung objects
Flamsteed objects
196504
101716
7880